The 2010 Paris–Roubaix was the 108th running of the Paris–Roubaix single-day cycling race, often known as the Hell of the North. The race was won by Swiss rider Fabian Cancellara.

Teams 
There were 25 teams for the 2010 Paris–Roubaix:

Teams for Paris-Roubaix

Wild Cards

Results

See also 
 2010 in Road Cycling

References

Paris–Roubaix
Paris-Roubaix
Paris-Roubaix
Paris-Roubaix